Hold On, I'm Comin' is the 1966 debut album by Atlantic Records soul duo Sam & Dave, issued on the Atlantic-distributed Stax label in 1966.

The album reached number one on the Billboard R&B Albums chart and number 45 on the Billboard Top LPs chart, launching two charting singles. The title track peaked at number one on the Billboard Hot Black Singles chart, and at number 21 on the Billboard Hot 100, while "You Don't Know Like I Know" peaked at number seven and number 90. An Allmusic review refers to Hold On, I'm Comin' as epitomizing "Memphis soul in all its unpretentious, down-home glory".

Background on "Hold On, I'm Comin'"

According to Steve Cropper, lead guitarist for Booker T and the MG's, the Stax Recording Studio played a key role in the creation of the title track, Hold on, I'm Comin'''.  Stax Records was an old Movie Theater located at 926 East McLemore Avenue in Memphis, Tennessee.  The men's restroom in the theater-turned studio had tile walls and tile floors.  To produce reverb and echo a speaker from the studio was placed in the men's room to pipe the sound into the men's room; and a microphone was placed in the men's room to return the sound back to the recording studio.  This arrangement produced both the reverb and echo heard on Stax Records.  The song was written by Isaac Hayes and David Porter. They had been working for a while when Porter went to the restroom. Hayes grew impatient and yelled for Porter to get back to the writing session. Porter replied: “Hold on, I'm comin’.” They both recognized the sexual overtone and completed the song within an hour.

Track listing
Except where otherwise noted, all tracks written by Isaac Hayes and David Porter.

Side one
"Hold On, I'm Comin'" – 2:36
"If You Got the Loving" (Steve Cropper, Hayes, Porter) – 2:33
"I Take What I Want" (Hayes, Mabon "Teenie" Hodges, Porter) – 2:33
"Ease Me" – 2:25
"I Got Everything I Need" (Cropper, Eddie Floyd, Alvertis Isbell) – 2:56
"Don't Make It So Hard on Me" (Floyd, Willia Dean "Deanie" Parker) – 2:45

Side two
"It's a Wonder" – 2:53
"Don't Help Me Out" – 3:09
"Just Me" (Randall Catron, Mary Frierson, Parker) – 2:40
"You Got It Made" – 2:33
"You Don't Know Like I Know" – 2:40
"Blame Me (Don't Blame My Heart)" (Cropper, Isbell) – 2:22

Personnel

 Samuel Moore – vocals
 Dave Prater – vocals
 Booker T. & the MG's and the Mar-Key Horns – instrumentation:
Booker T. Jones – keyboards
Isaac Hayes – Hammond organ
Steve Cropper – guitar
Donald Dunn – bass guitar
Al Jackson Jr. – drums
Wayne Jackson – trombone, trumpet
Charles "Packy" Axton – tenor saxophone
Don Nix – baritone saxophone
Technical
 Deanie Parker  – liner notes
 Ronnie Stoots – cover artwork

Cover versions
Aretha Franklin recorded the title song for her 1981 album Love All the Hurt Away.

In August, 2007 soul singer Guy Sebastian recorded a tribute version of "Hold On, I'm Comin" at Ardent Studios in Memphis, Tennessee for his album of soul classics The Memphis Album with many of the original Stax music band members including Steve Cropper, Donald Duck Dunn, Lester Snell and Steve Potts.

Another cover version was recorded by Cliff Bennett and the Rebel Rousers in 1966. Tom Jones covered it on the 1967 album 13 Smash Hits''.

Many other artists have covered this song, including: Eric Burdon (The Animals), Bryan Ferry, Solomon Burke, The Chords, Eric Clapton/BB King, Marvin Banks, Michael Bolton, the Weather Girls, King Curtis, George Benson, Tina Turner, Jerry Lee Lewis, Iron Butterfly, Martha & the Vandellas, Dexy's Midnight Runners, the Boogie Kings, Bruce Springsteen, Precious Wilson (Eruption), Melissa Etheridge and Hanson.

Some artists sampled some parts of the song like Village People in their song "I'm a Cruiser" (1978).

See also
List of number-one R&B albums of 1966 (U.S.)

References

1966 debut albums
Sam & Dave albums
Stax Records albums
Atlantic Records albums